The Nant Morlais may refer to one of several small rivers in Wales. These include

 Afon Morlais - a river running from Crosshands to the estuary of the River Loughor
 Nant Morlais - the tributary of the River Taff from Ponsticill reservoir to the Taff Fawr in Merthyr Tydfil